Bądy is a village in northern Poland.

Bady may also refer to:

Places
Bady Bassitt, a municipality in the state of São Paulo, Brazil

People
Bady (footballer), real name Renato Escobar Baruffi (born 1989), Brazilian footballer
Bady Minck, Luxembourgian filmmaker, film producer and artist
Berthe Bady (1872–1921), French actress of Belgian origin
Percy Bady, American singer, keyboardist, arranger, producer and composer

See also
Badi (disambiguation)